Mnium hornum, also known by the common name horn calcareous moss, is a species of moss in the genus Mnium.

References

    

Mniaceae
Plants described in 1801
Taxa named by Johann Hedwig